Leigha Amy Simonton is an American lawyer who has served as United States attorney for the Northern District of Texas since December 2022.

Education 

Simonton earned a Bachelor of Arts  in history from the University of Texas at Austin in 1997 and a Juris Doctor from Yale Law School in 2001.

Career 

Simonton served as a law clerk for Judge Barbara M. Lynn of the United States District Court for the Northern District of Texas in 2001 and 2002 and Circuit Judge Patrick Higginbotham of the United States Court of Appeals for the Fifth Circuit  in 2002 and 2003. From 2003 to 2005, she was an associate at Haynes and Boone in their Dallas, Texas office. From 2005 to 2022, she served as an assistant United States attorney in the United States Attorney's Office for the Northern District of Texas.

U.S. attorney for the Northern District of Texas 

On October 14, 2022, President Joe Biden announced his intent to nominate Simonton to be the United States attorney for the Northern District of Texas. On November 14, 2022, her nomination was sent to the United States Senate. Simonton was recommended to the post by Senators John Cornyn and Ted Cruz. On November 17, 2022, her nomination was reported out of committee by a voice vote. On December 6, 2022, her nomination was confirmed in the Senate by voice vote. She was sworn in by District Judge Barbara M. Lynn on December 10, 2022.

References 

Living people
21st-century American women lawyers
21st-century American lawyers
Assistant United States Attorneys
Texas lawyers
United States Attorneys for the Northern District of Texas
University of Texas at Austin alumni
Yale Law School alumni
Year of birth missing (living people)